Vandana Srinivasan is an Indian playback singer, working mainly as an independent singer and for the South Indian film industry especially kollywood.

Biography 

Vandana began training in the Carnatic Classical music at an early age from her Guru, Mrs. Seetha Krishnan till she finished high school. She moved to Madras, India, in 2006 to major in Psychology at Women's Christian College (University of Madras). Here, she trained in the Hindustani Classical music under her Guru, Mrs. Tanushree Saha. She moved to London in 2009 to pursue a postgraduate degree in Organizational & Social Psychology from the London School of Economics & Political Science. She was exposed to various musical influences in London and she particularly enjoyed exploring Bangla music. Following her return to Madras in early 2011, she established herself as an independent musician and playback singer.
  
  

In 2017 she gave a TEDx talk on the Life of a Musician. 

She runs a collaboration initiative - Musicalorie Pruductions - and is actively involved in working with different artists. Vandana is married to Anand Pattathil, a business man, and is settled in Chennai. Vandana and Anand also run an online boutique called anastoriesonline on Instagram.

Discography 

Playback Singing

References 

http://www.thehindu.com/todays-paper/tp-features/tp-metroplus/groove-to-ghazals-and-more/article19152578.ece

External links 

 
 Vandana's SoundCloud Stream
 Vandana's YouTube Channel
 Vandana's Twitter account

Living people
Indian women playback singers
Women Carnatic singers
Carnatic singers
Year of birth missing (living people)
Place of birth missing (living people)
Indian women classical singers
Singers from Chennai
Women musicians from Tamil Nadu
21st-century Indian women singers
21st-century Indian singers